The Dallewalia misl was a Khatri Sikh state in 18th century India.  The founder of this Misl was Sardar Gulab Singh resident of the village of Dallewal near Dera Baba Nanak, in Doaba Bist Jalandhar.  He took Pahul and became an active member of the Dal Khalsa in 1726 A.D and launched upon a career of chivalry, fighting against the tyrannical government of the Punjab. One day at the head of 150 comrades, he attacked Jalandhar and having obtained a rich booty all of them returned to their camp in the jungle safely.

Gulab Singh, with his two brothers, Dayal Singh and Gurdyal Singh and two sons, Jaipal Singh and Hardyal Singh, actively participated in the chhota ghallughara in June 1746. In 1748, Gulab Singh was declared to be the head of the Dallewalias, with Gurdyal Singh and Tara Singh Ghaiba as his deputies

Skirmish with Najib Khan Rohilla of Najibabad 
In the year 1756, in collaboration with his friend, Sardar Karora Singh, Gulab Singh attacked Najib Khan Rohilla of Najibabad. Nawab Doda Khan offered a stiff resistance in the beginning but shortly thereafter he escaped from the battlefield. Later, Gulab Singh chastised Nawab Zabita Khan of Meerut. Then, he turned his attention towards Muzaffarnagar, Deoband, Miranpur and Saharanpur. Finding themselves unable to face him, the rulers of these places offered tribute and paid obeisance to him.

Encounter with Ahmed Shah Abdali 
In 1756-57, when Ahmad Shah Abdali, after plundering Delhi, was carrying with him a huge booty and many young Hindu girls, he was obstructed by the Sikhs at river Ravi and dispossessed of much of the booty. All the girls were got released from the Afghans and restored to their parents. Gulab Singh, accompanied by his men, actively participated in this enterprise. The same year, an intelligence of the Sikhs gave them an information that revenue, to the tune of five lakh rupees, collected from the area between Sarai Rawalpindi and Rohtas, was being carried to Lahore. Hearing this news Gulab Singh and Karora Singh, at the head of their men, attacked the guard that was escorting the treasure near Jhelum and took away the money with which they purchased provisions and distributed the same among the dais of the Khalsa.

Decline 
Gulab Singh died in 1759, in the Battle of Kalanaur, 27 km west of Gurdaspur, fighting against Ambo Khan. His two sons, Jaipal Singh and Hardyal Singh had died earlier in the Battle of Basohli. So the leadership of the Misal was entrusted to Gurdyal Singh, one of the close associates of Gulab Singh. Gurdyal Singh also died about an year after the assumption of the Sardari of the Misal. Tara Singh succeeded Gurdyal Singh

After the Death of Sardar Gulab Singh in 1759 his Successor was Sardar Tara Singh Ghaiba (1717–1807) who Ruled and further Expanded his Misl up to Ambala Area (Haryana Region). With other Sikh Sardars he Sacked Kasur city of Pathans and Joined the Sikh Sardars in the sack of Sirhind City in 1764. in 1807 after the death of Tara Singh Ghaiba His Territories were annexed to the Kingdom of Ranjit Singh. The Dallewalia and Nishanwalia Jathas were stationed at Amritsar to protect the holy city.

See also 
 Sardar Gulab Singh
 Sardar Tara Singh Ghaiba

References 

Misls
History of Sikhism
Sikh Empire
Princely states of India
Princely states of Punjab
Jalandhar district
History of Punjab
History of Punjab, India
Rajput princely states